The 1977 Sudanese Juba coup d'état attempt was an unsuccessful coup, led by 12 Air Force members who had previously been members of Anyanya. The exact specifications of the coup attempt vary, although tend to focus on a failed attempt by the group to take the Juba airport.

The coup's political leadership, consisting of High Executive Council members Joseph Oduho, Benjamin Akok, and Malath Joseph, had been previously arrested, and some sources suggest the group attempted to storm Juba prison, to release the group's arrested leadership.

Harold Bowman, a 30 year old pilot with Africa Inland Mission was killed while driving passengers to the Juba airport during the shooting.

References

Military coups in Sudan
Coup d'etat
1970s coups d'état and coup attempts
Attempted coups d'état in Sudan
February 1977 events in Africa